Kelly Craig (born October 1984) is a Canadian model and actress from Montreal, Quebec.

She is best known for her work in modeling. She was featured in the April 2006 edition of ELLE Canada and ELLE Québec.

Her first film role was as a stunt double for fellow model and actress Bridget Moynahan, in the 2000 film Coyote Ugly. Her first character role however, was in the 2006 film adaptation of Frank Miller's graphic novel 300.

In 300, she played the role of the Oracle, a young Spartan girl who was chosen for her beauty and is guarded by the old Ephors, being frequently molested by them. Her words, spoken in a trance, are interpreted by the corrupt priests as a message that the gods do not want King Leonidas to break the Carneia and attack the Persians. Although she appears only briefly in the film, a still from the film of her in a state of trance is featured as the sole image on one of the film posters.

Filmography

References

External links 
 
 
 Kelly Craig on Myspace

1984 births
Actresses from Montreal
Female models from Quebec
Canadian film actresses
Living people